Ekaterina Sergeyevna Borisova, (born 13 September 1999) is a Russian former competitive pair skater. With partner Dmitry Sopot, she is the 2016 Youth Olympic champion, the 2016 World Junior bronze medalist, and 2015 Junior Grand Prix Final champion.

Career 
Borisova began learning to skate in 2003. She competed as a single skater before teaming up with Sergei Lisiev, in 2012. She skated two seasons with Lisiev.

Partnership with Sopot 
Borisova teamed up with Dmitry Sopot in the summer of 2014. The two qualified for the 2015 Russian Junior Championships and finished in 8th place.

Borisova/Sopot made their international debut competing in the 2015–16 Junior Grand Prix (JGP) series. They took the bronze medal at their first assignment, the JGP in Latvia, before winning gold at the JGP in Poland. These results qualified them for the 2015–16 JGP Final in Barcelona. In Spain, they outscored the Czech Republic's Anna Dušková / Martin Bidař by 9.53 points for the gold medal.

In January 2016, Borisova/Sopot were awarded the bronze medal at the Russian Junior Championships, having finished third to Anastasia Mishina / Vladislav Mirzoev (gold) and Amina Atakhanova / Ilia Spiridonov (silver). In February, they represented Russia at the 2016 Winter Youth Olympics in Hamar, Norway. Ranked second in the short program and first in the free skate, they won the gold by a margin of 2.53 points over Dušková/Bidař. On March 17–21, competing at the 2016 World Junior Championships in Debrecen, Hungary, Borisova/Sopot placed fourth in the short and third in the free, taking the bronze medal overall behind Czech pair skaters Anna Dušková / Martin Bidař and teammates Anastasia Mishina / Vladislav Mirzoev who took the gold and silver medals respectively.

Programs 
(with Sopot)

(with Lisiev)

Competitive highlights 
JGP: Junior Grand Prix

With Sopot

With Lisiev

Detailed results 

With Sopot

References

External links 

 
 

1999 births
Russian female pair skaters
World Junior Figure Skating Championships medalists
Living people
Sportspeople from Chelyabinsk
Figure skaters at the 2016 Winter Youth Olympics
Youth Olympic gold medalists for Russia